Carl John Nichols (born June 25, 1970) is a United States district judge of the United States District Court for the District of Columbia.

Biography 

Nichols received a Bachelor of Arts in 1992 from Dartmouth College, where he majored in philosophy and graduated with high honors. He received a Juris Doctor in 1996 from the University of Chicago Law School, where he graduated Order of the Coif and was a member of the University of Chicago Law Review. He began his legal career as a law clerk to Judge Laurence Silberman of the United States Court of Appeals for the District of Columbia Circuit. He then clerked for Associate Justice Clarence Thomas of the Supreme Court of the United States.

Nichols worked in private practice and later joined the United States Department of Justice as a deputy assistant attorney general for the Federal Programs Branch of the Civil Division, and then as principal deputy associate attorney general. He left the government in 2009 and joined Wilmer Cutler Pickering Hale and Dorr, where he worked as a partner until 2019.

Federal judicial service 

Nichols was mentioned as a potential judicial nominee in March 2018. On June 7, 2018, President Donald Trump announced his intent to nominate Nichols to serve as a United States district judge of the United States District Court for the District of Columbia. On June 18, 2018, his nomination was sent to the Senate. President Trump nominated Nichols to the seat vacated by Richard W. Roberts, who assumed senior status on March 16, 2016. On August 22, 2018, a hearing on his nomination was held before the Senate Judiciary Committee. On October 11, 2018, his nomination was reported out of committee by an 11–10 vote.

On January 3, 2019, his nomination was returned to the President under Rule XXXI, Paragraph 6 of the United States Senate. On January 23, 2019, President Trump announced his intent to renominate Nichols for the same federal judgeship. His nomination was sent to the Senate later that day. On February 7, 2019, his nomination was reported out of committee by a 12–10 vote. On May 21, 2019, the Senate invoked cloture on his nomination by a 55–42 vote. On May 22, 2019, his nomination was confirmed by a 55–43 vote. He received his judicial commission on June 25, 2019.

Notable cases

U.S. v. Miller, no. 21-119 (D.D.C.)
In March 2022, Nichols ruled that Garret Miller, one of the defendants criminally charged in connection with the 2021 U. S. Capitol attack, could not be charged with obstructing Congress’s certification of the 2020 Presidential election without a showing that Miller had tampered with official documents or records as part of the attack. Nichols's ruling is contrary to those of all seven other U.S. District Court judges who had considered the same issue, and may affect up to 275 similar criminal prosecutions. The difference of opinion between Nichols and the other judges may lead to the issue being resolved on appeal, or by petition to the U.S. Supreme Court.

Dominion defamation lawsuits 
On August 11, 2021, Nichols denied motions to dismiss lawsuits brought by Dominion Voting Systems alleging that Sidney Powell (1:21-cv-00040 (CJN)), Rudy Giuliani (1:21-cv-00213 (CJN)), and Mike Lindell (1:21-cv-00445 (CJN)) defamed and damaged Dominion by their statements alleging fraud and misconduct in the 2020 presidential election.  Those lawsuits therefore were allowed to proceed.

TikTok Inc. v. Trump, no. 20-2658 (D.D.C)
On Sunday, September 27, 2020, Judge Nichols, granting in part the motion of plaintiffs TikTok and ByteDance, issued a preliminary injunction partially enjoining (i.e., temporarily stopping) the Department of Commerce's implementation of President Donald Trump's August 6, 2020, executive order prohibiting certain transactions related to TikTok.  The portion of the prohibition that Nichols enjoined would have barred Apple and Google from offering TikTok in their app stores, and would have taken effect just before midnight that night.  

On December 7, 2020, Judge Nichols granted a second preliminary injunction requested by TikTok and ByteBance, enjoining the remainder of the Commerce Department's implementation of that executive order. The case (then captioned TikTok v. Biden) was dismissed by joint stipulation of the parties on July 21, 2021, following President Biden's decision to rescind President Trump's August 6, 2020, executive order.

Donald J. Trump v. Committee on Ways and Means, et al, no. 19-2173 (D.D.C.)
On August 1, 2019, Nichols issued a temporary order which barred the State of New York from handing over state tax returns to the U.S. House Committee on Ways and Means and established a briefing and hearing schedule. The state, through its attorney general and co-defendant Letitia James, promptly asked Nichols to dismiss the lawsuit or transfer it to a federal court in New York, on the ground that it cannot be maintained against them where the defendants neither reside nor act. On November 11, 2019, Nichols dismissed the lawsuit, finding that the court did not have jurisdiction over the New York Attorney General or the commissioner of the New York Department of Taxation and Finance.

U.S. v. Steve Bannon 
Nichols is the judge for the Steve Bannon contempt of Congress case.

Memberships 
Nichols has been a member of the Federalist Society; once from 2003 to 2008 and again in 2018.

See also 
 List of law clerks of the Supreme Court of the United States (Seat 10)

References

External links 
 
 

1970 births
Living people
20th-century American lawyers
21st-century American judges
21st-century American lawyers
Dartmouth College alumni
Federalist Society members
George W. Bush administration personnel
Judges of the United States District Court for the District of Columbia
Law clerks of the Supreme Court of the United States
Lawyers from Washington, D.C.
People from Rhinebeck, New York
United States Department of Justice lawyers
United States district court judges appointed by Donald Trump
University of Chicago Law School alumni
Wilmer Cutler Pickering Hale and Dorr partners